The Avant Armour, in the R. L. Scott collection in Glasgow, is one of the oldest near-complete armours in the world. It is in almost perfect condition. It is named after the repeating inscription on the breastplate - avant, meaning "forward!". The armour was made in about 1440-45 for a member of the Matchs family of Churburg Castle.

The Avant armour was made in Milan, one of medieval Europe's most famous armour-making cities. This armor is considered well-formed and visually appealing. Like all armours of this quality, the Avant armour is also covered in armourer's marks - 51 in total - the signatures of the skilled craftsmen who made it. .

References

Body armor
Individual suits of armour